Bandon is a city in Coos County, Oregon, United States, on the south side of the mouth of the Coquille River. It was named by George Bennet, an Irish peer, who settled nearby in 1873 and named the town after Bandon in Ireland, his hometown.  The population was 3,066 at the 2010 census and by the 2020 census 3,321.

History 
Before 1850, the Coquille Indians lived in the area. Then in 1851, gold was discovered at nearby Whiskey Run Beach by French Canadian trappers, though the gold rush did not have much of an impact on the area. In 1852, Henry Baldwin, from County Cork, Ireland, was shipwrecked on the Coos Bay bar and walked into this area. The first permanent European settlers came in 1853 and established the present town site. In 1856, the first conflicts with Indigenous Americans in the area arose and those were sent to the Siletz Reservation. In 1859, the boat Twin Sisters sailed into the Coquille River and opened the outlet for all inland produce and resources.

Bandon was founded by the Irish peer George Bennett in 1873. George Bennett, his sons Joseph and George, and George Sealey came from Bandon, Ireland. The following year the town's previous name of Averille was changed to Bandon after the town of the same name in Ireland. The next year, Joseph Williams and his three sons arrived, also from Bandon, Ireland. In 1877, the post office was established. In 1880, cheese making began. That same year, Congress appropriated money to build the jetty. In 1883, the first sawmill, school house, and Catholic church were built. In 1884, the U.S. Army Corps of Engineers began construction on the jetty.

 George Bennett also introduced gorse (Ulex europaeus) into the local area, which in the following decades went wild and became a nuisance in both the town and in the neighboring countryside. Gorse, a spiny plant, grows so thickly a person cannot walk through it. It is also a very oily plant, which easily catches fire.

Cranberries have been grown in Bandon since 1885, when Charles McFarlin planted vines he brought from Massachusetts. McFarlin had originally come to pan for gold in California. He did not make his fortune, or even a living, so he turned to what he knew best. He brought vines from Cape Cod and planted them in the state's first cranberry bog near Hauser. This bog produced cranberries for eight decades. His variety adapted to growing conditions on the west coast. The variety was named McFarlin in his honor and was the principal variety grown on the west coast until overtaken by the Stevens variety. Bandon is also the location of the first cranberry bogs to be wet harvested, which is done by building dikes around the bogs then flooding them.

In 2010, Bandon was named one of the "Coolest Small Towns in America" by BudgetTravel.

Fire
On September 26, 1936, a fire burned several miles of forest east of town. But a sudden shift in the wind drove the flames swiftly westward. Ignited by the forest fire, the town's abundant gorse became engulfed in flames, Bandon resident D.H. Woomer told The Coos Bay Times. Bandon's entire commercial district was destroyed. The total loss stated at the time was $3 million USD, with 11 fatalities.

Ironically, the gorse was first introduced to the Oregon Coast by the founder of Bandon, Lord George Bennett, from his native Ireland.

Firefighters found that burning gorse reacted to having water squirted on it like a kitchen grease fire—it simply spread burning gobs of gorse everywhere. Stewart Holbrook described this conflagration in his essay "The Gorse of Bandon."

Part of the commercial district had been erected on wooden pilings jutting out over the Coquille River not far from the South Jetty, accommodating river traffic at the merchants' doors.  After the 1936 fire, when Bandon began to be rebuilt, the new perimeter of the business district did not extend beyond the available land.

There is still gorse in Bandon today, but municipal codes strictly regulate how high and thick it may be allowed to get.

Geography

Climate

Located at the northern end of the Brookings banana belt, Bandon has a warm-summer Mediterranean climate (Köppen Csb), making it drier, sunnier and warmer than most other locations on the Oregon coast. Rain and overcast conditions are common in the winter months, while during the summer it is mostly dry. Snow can occur during the winter, however, this is not very common and usually occurs about once or twice a season. Below freezing temperatures are rare in the city, usually occurring about once or twice a winter. Summers are dry and cool with an average July high temperature of about  while lows are generally in the 50s °F. High temperatures in the mid-70s °F to the low 90s °F occur on average about once or twice every summer. Bandon's highest reading of  occurred on September 21, 1990. 

Demographics

2010 census
As of the census of 2010, there were 3,066 people, 1,466 households, and 762 families residing in the city. The racial makeup of the city was 92.6% White, 0.4% African American, 1.4% Native American, 0.8% Asian, 0.1% Pacific Islander, 1.4% from other races, and 3.4% from two or more races. Hispanic or Latino of any race were 5.5% of the population.

There were 1,466 households, of which 18.1% had children under the age of 18 living with them, 37.6% were married couples living together, 10.2% had a female householder with no husband present, 4.2% had a male householder with no wife present, and 48.0% were non-families. 39.6% of all households were made up of individuals, and 20.8% had someone living alone who was 65 years of age or older. The average household size was 2.01 and the average family size was 2.62.

The median age in the city was 53.4 years. 15.3% of residents were under the age of 18; 6.3% were between the ages of 18 and 24; 17.3% were from 25 to 44; 31.2% were from 45 to 64; and 30% were 65 years of age or older. The gender makeup of the city was 46.3% male and 53.7% female.

2000 census
As of the census of 2000, there were 2,833 people, 1,287 households, and 736 families residing in the city. The population density was 1,029.4 people per square mile (397.8/km). There were 1,535 housing units at an average density of 557.8 per square mile (215.5/km). The racial makeup of the city was 92.48% White, 0.25% African American, 1.94% Native American, 0.60% Asian, 0.11% Pacific Islander, 0.95% from other races, and 3.67% from two or more races. Hispanic or Latino of any race were 2.75% of the population.

There were 1,287 households, out of which 21.2% had children under the age of 18 living with them, 43.4% were married couples living together, 10.1% had a female householder with no husband present, and 42.8% were non-families. 36.1% of all households were made up of individuals, and 19.0% had someone living alone who was 65 years of age or older. The average household size was 2.09 and the average family size was 2.71.

In the city, the population dispersal was 19.1% under the age of 18, 4.7% from 18 to 24, 19.4% from 25 to 44, 27.5% from 45 to 64, and 29.4% who were 65 years of age or older. The median age was 49 years. For every 100 females, there were 82.4 males. For every 100 females age 18 and over, there were 80.0 males. The median income for a household in the city was $29,492, and the median income for a family was $37,188. Males had a median income of $28,636 versus $22,722 for females. The per capita income for the city was $20,051. About 11.9% of families and 16.0% of the population were below the poverty line, including 34.1% of those under age 18 and 6.0% of those age 65 or over.

Economy 
Like many communities on the Oregon coast, Bandon had significant fishing and timber industries, which were greatly diminished by the 1980s, though some remnants still exist. Bandon's current economy revolves around  wood products, fishing, tourism, and agriculture. The five largest employers in the area include Bandon Dunes Golf Course, Southern Coos Health District, School District #54C, Oregon Overseas Timber, and Hardin Optical.

Tourism 
 
In tourism literature, the city is often referred to as Bandon-by-the-Sea.

Surf enthusiasts come to Bandon for surfing & kite surfing
Bandon beaches offer a wide variety of surf opportunities for novice, intermediate, and expert surfers of both disciplines. Crowds are nonexistent and locals are friendly and accommodating.

Mountain bikers enjoy the newly opened Whiskey Run Mountain Bike Trails just north of town mountain biking.

One popular tourist activity is storm watching.

West Coast Game Park Safari is located just south of Bandon.

Cranberry industry 
Bandon is a center of cranberry production. More than 100 growers harvest about  around Bandon, raising 95 percent of Oregon's cranberries, and about 5 percent of the national crop. Production averages about 30 million pounds (14 million kg) of berries. Harvest is in the fall. In 1994,  were harvested—a record for Bandon. Some berries are trucked to Eugene and Albany. Others are taken to an Ocean Spray facility in Prosser, Washington, to be concentrated. This crop was introduced in 1855 by Charles McFarlin, for whom the McFarlin hybrid is named.

Cranberry Festival 
The Annual Cranberry Festival takes place in the second weekend of September to celebrate the Cranberry harvest. The event draws tourists and participants from all areas of the Oregon coast, Washington and California. Begun in 1946, to honor the cranberry industry, 2016 marked the 70th year of the event. Bandon has long been known as the "Cranberry Capital of Oregon".

Cheese 

Between 1928 and 2000, dairy production and cheesemaking were an integral part of Bandon's economy.  The Bandon facility was damaged by fire in 1936, and rebuilt as the Surfside Dairy in 1937.
In 2000, Tillamook County Creamery Association bought the Bandon Cheese brand and promptly dismantled the factory; on October 4, 2005, the last of the staff was released and the Bandon factory closed.  The Bandon Cheese name lives on as a brand of Tillamook Cheese.

In 2013, Face Rock Creamery opened on the former Bandon Cheese property with participation of the city government.  Cheesemakers handcraft gourmet cheeses from beginning to end with viewing, sampling, and products available to visitors.  There is a selection of flavored cheese curds which one cheese critic received favorably. The lead cheese maker for Face Rock Creamery is the son of the lead cheese maker from Bandon Cheese Factory.

Golf resort 

Bandon Dunes Golf Resort is a complex of six golf courses located just north of the city of Bandon. Five of the six golf courses are regulation length and the other is a short 13 hole par 3 course. The championship courses, Bandon Dunes, Old Macdonald, Pacific Dunes, and Bandon Trails are the top four courses in Oregon, (Passov, J., Golf Magazine, "Top 100 Courses You Can Play", Sept., 2016, p. 62).

Points of interest 

 Bandon is known for its beaches and rock formations, including Face Rock State Scenic Viewpoint.
 The Coquille River Lighthouse is on Coquille River's north jetty at Bullards Beach State Park.
 The Bandon Cranberry Festival is celebrated every fall as the cranberry harvest begins.
 Bandon State Airport
 Bullards Bridge on U.S. Highway 101 leading into Bandon from the north
 Oregon Islands National Wildlife Refuge

Notable people 

 Bill Bradbury, Oregon Secretary of State, 1999 - 2009
 Randal O'Toole, economist
 James V. Scotti, astronomer
 Timothy Zahn, author
 Wlnsvey Campos State Representative for Oregon House District 28

Jules Verne book

It is noteworthy that French writer Jules Verne, in his science fiction novel The Begum's Fortune, placed virtually near the precise site of Bandon, Oregon, his fictional Utopian community "Ville-France". The fictional community was given the foundation date of 1872—one year before the foundation of the actual Bandon. Ville-France was depicted as being founded by Doctor Sarrasin, a visionary French doctor; reaching a population of 100,000 within a few years of its creation and becoming world-famous as a model community; being granted by the US government the status of a virtually independent city state; and being involved in a vicious war with a rival city state on the other side of the Cascades, founded by an evil German scientist.

Media 
 Bandon Western World - weekly newspaper
 KBOG-LP 97.9 FM

Sister City 
Bandon has one sister city:

  Bandon, Ireland

See also 
 Port of Bandon
 Steamboats of the Coquille River (historical)
 FASTER (submarine communications)

References

External links 

 Entry for Bandon in the Oregon Blue Book
 Bandon Chamber of Commerce
 Bandon Historical Museum
 Offbeat Oregon History article on gorse and the Bandon fire

Cities in Oregon
Populated coastal places in Oregon
Cities in Coos County, Oregon
Oregon Coast
Port cities in Oregon
Seaside resorts in Oregon
1853 establishments in Oregon Territory
Populated places established in 1853